Adamsson is a Scandinavian surname.

Ann-Mari Adamsson, Swedish actress
Folke Adamsson, Swedish football manager and former player.
Gösta Adamsson, Norwegian-born rower who represented Sweden
Johan Adamsson, birth name of Juhani Aataminpoika, Finnish serial killer
Stefan Adamsson, Swedish former cyclist

Surnames of Scandinavian origin
Surnames from given names